Miloš Máca (23 January 1927 – 27 March 1984) was a Czech athlete. He competed in the men's hammer throw at the 1952 Summer Olympics.

References

External links
 

1927 births
1984 deaths
Athletes (track and field) at the 1952 Summer Olympics
Czech male hammer throwers
Olympic athletes of Czechoslovakia
People from Boskovice
Sportspeople from the South Moravian Region